The 2019–20 Valencia Club de Fútbol season was the club's 100th in the club's history and their 85th in La Liga.
The club had qualified for the UEFA Champions League for the second season in a row, entering in the group stage. Valencia failed to defend the Copa del Rey that they won the previous season, losing to Granada in the quarter-finals after entering at the round of 32. As a result of the Copa del Rey win, Valencia competed in the Spanish Super Cup for the first time since 2008.

Players

Squad information

Transfers

In

Total spend: €76,000,000

Out

Total income: €46,000,000
Net income: -€30,000,000

**Valencia signed Maxi Gómez for €14,500,000 with Mina and Sáenz joining Celta as part of the deal. Celta have a buy option on Sáenz, who joins on loan for 2 seasons, with Valencia retaining a buy back option in the event that the buy option is exercised.

***Murillo joins Sampdoria on loan for 1 season, with the club having an obligation to buy him for €13,000,000 at the end of the loan.

Pre-season and friendlies

Competitions

Overview

La Liga

League table

Results summary

Results by round

Matches
The La Liga schedule was announced on 4 July 2019.

Copa del Rey

Supercopa de España

UEFA Champions League

Group stage

Group H

Knockout phase

Round of 16

Statistics

Appearances and goals
Last updated on the end of the season

|-
! colspan=14 style=background:#dcdcdc; text-align:center|Goalkeepers

|-
! colspan=14 style=background:#dcdcdc; text-align:center|Defenders

|-
! colspan=14 style=background:#dcdcdc; text-align:center|Midfielders

|-
! colspan=14 style=background:#dcdcdc; text-align:center|Forwards

|-
! colspan=14 style=background:#dcdcdc; text-align:center| Players who have made an appearance or had a squad number this season but have been loaned out or transferred

|}

References

External links
Club's official website

Valencia
Valencia CF seasons
2019–20 UEFA Champions League participants seasons